Feistmantel Valley is a fossiliferous valley lying south of Shimmering Icefield and west of Mount Watters in the Allan Hills, Oates Land, Antarctica. It was reconnoitered by the New Zealand Antarctic Research Program Allan Hills Expedition (1964), who named it after Professor Otokar Feistmantel, who made pioneering studies of Gondwana flora.

References 

Valleys of Oates Land